The 33rd Louisiana Infantry Regiment was a short-lived unit of volunteers recruited in Louisiana that fought in the Confederate States Army during the American Civil War. The unit was created by consolidating the 10th and 12th Louisiana Infantry Battalions near Donaldsonville, Louisiana, on 10 October 1862. Part of the regiment fought poorly in the Battle of Georgia Landing (Labadieville) on 27 October. Because the consolidation was deeply unpopular, Major General Richard Taylor broke up the regiment on 22 November 1862 and restored the two original battalion organizations.

See also
List of Louisiana Confederate Civil War units
Louisiana in the Civil War

Notes

References
 

Units and formations of the Confederate States Army from Louisiana
1862 establishments in Louisiana
Military units and formations established in 1862
1862 disestablishments in Louisiana
Military units and formations disestablished in 1862